Tamara Klink is a Brazilian sailor and writer. At the age of 24, she became the youngest Brazilian to cross the Atlantic Ocean navigating solo.

Biography 
Tamara is a daughter of Marina Bandeira Klink and Amyr Klink, a photographer and a sailor, respectively. Since her childhood, she had the opportunity to sail with her parents. In 2010, she published the book "Férias na Antártica" (Vacations in Antarctica) with her sisters Laura and Marina Helena. The book is the result of a series of trips to Antarctica made by her family. This book has been included in the curriculum of many Brazilian schools.

Tamara has a master's degree in architecture from the École Supérieure d’Architecture, of Nantes. In 2020, when she was 23 years old, she finished her first solo sailing trip, crossing the North Sea between Ålesund, Norway and Dunkirk, France, on board of the Sardinha sailboat.

Between August and November 2021, she crossed the Atlantic Ocean sailing solo. She departed from France and arrived in Recife, Brazil. With that fact, she became the youngest Brazilian women to cross the Atlantic navigating solo.

Also in 2021, she published two books: “Mil Milhas” and “Um mundo em poucas linhas”.

In January and February 2022, Tamara made another solo sailing trip with her Sardinha sailboat. This time she navigated from Recife to Paraty, a historical town in the state of Rio de Janeiro.

Books 
 Férias na Antártica
 Mil Milhas
 Um mundo em poucas linhas

References 

Brazilian sailors (sport)
Living people
1997 births
Brazilian sailors
Brazilian women writers
Brazilian people of Swedish descent
Brazilian people of Lebanese descent
People from Paraty